Manifold Destiny is a 1989 cookbook, its updated 1998 edition and a 2008 update on the subject of cooking on the surface of a car engine. It was written by Chris Maynard and Bill Scheller, a photographer and a travel writer who were also accomplished rally drivers. Though neither edition remained in print for very long, the book is considered something of a cult classic in the American culinary scene due to its unusual subject matter, combining local specialties ("ready-boughts") with recipes designed with various regional and ethnic inspirations in mind, as well as evaluations of representative cars available at the time of their suitability as cooking equipment. A measure of its cult status can be found on Amazon.com, where a search in May 2007 revealed that used copies of the book sold for four to ten times the cover price of the book. In addition, despite its somewhat humorous tone, it is often cited as the primary (or even only) reference on the subject of car engine cooking.

The authors claimed inspiration from a trip from Montreal to Boston, where the authors were inspired to keep a package of smoked meat from Schwartz's in Montreal hot by placing it in a secure spot on the car's engine block, having heard that it was said to be common for truckers to keep cans of soup hot by doing the same thing.

See also
Outdoor cooking

References

  

  

Cookbooks
1989 non-fiction books
Transport culture